Ülo Nugis (28 April 1944 – 18 November 2011) was an Estonian politician and economist. As Speaker of the Supreme Council of Estonia on 20 August 1991, he presided over the Supreme Council's historic session when it voted for the  restoration of Estonia's national independence from the Soviet Union.

Early life 
Ülo Nugis was born on 28 April 1944 in Tallinn. He studied at Tallinn Technical Secondary School for Building and Mechanics from 1958 to 1962, at Tallinn Polytechnic Institute from 1962 to 1965, and finally at Belarusian State Polytechnic Institute from 1965 to 1967 graduating in mechanical engineering.

Career 
Nugis worked as a teacher at Tallinn Technical Secondary School for Building and Mechanics from 1967 to 1968, and at various positions in the Pioneer and Tegur factories from 1968 to 1974. In 1974, Nugis became director of the building materials factory Ehitusdetail, and in 1980 director of a ski factory, Dünamo. In 1986, he became director of the Estoplast factory. Under his leadership, central Soviet Union control of Estoplast was transferred to local Estonian control in 1988. Together with other Estonian-minded industrial leaders, Nugis formed the Union of Work Collectives where he became the leader.

In 1990, Nugis was elected to the Estonian Supreme Council at the first mostly free elections, becoming Speaker. That same year, he left the Communist Party and founded the Republican Coalition Party. On 20 August 1991, he presided over the Supreme Council's historic session where it voted to  restore Estonia's national independence, with the gavel strike by Nugis confirming the result. In October, Nugis became the first Estonian politician to publicly state that the country should try to join NATO as soon as possible, even as Soviet troops were still present in the Baltic nation.

In 1992 he became the speaker of the newly elected Riigikogu. Over the years he was in multiple different parties, including the Pro Patria National Coalition Party, People's Party of Republicans and Conservatives, and the Estonian Coalition Party. After splitting from the latter, he created the New Estonia party, which he led from 2001 to 2003 before merging it into the People's Union of Estonia. At the same year Nugis retired from politics.

Nugis was a member of the 20 August Club which is an organization that is composed of the former members of the Supreme Council who had voted for the restoration of Estonian independence.

Personal life 
Nugis and his wife, Vaike, had a son, Uno.

Death 
Nugis died on 18 November 2011. The funeral at Charles' Church in Tallinn was attended by Estonian presidents Toomas Hendrik Ilves and Arnold Rüütel, among others. The coffin was covered with the Estonian flag that had flown over Pikk Hermann on 20 August that year. Nugis was buried at Metsakalmistu cemetery.

Awards 
Nugis was awarded Order of the National Coat of Arms 4th class in 2001 and 2nd class in 2004, and memorial medal “10 years of restoration of the Defence Forces” in 2001.

References 

1944 births
2011 deaths
Politicians from Tallinn
Estonian engineers
Voters of the Estonian restoration of Independence
People of the Singing Revolution
Tallinn University of Technology alumni
Members of the Riigikogu, 1992–1995
Members of the Riigikogu, 1995–1999
Members of the Riigikogu, 1999–2003
Speakers of the Riigikogu
Leaders of political parties in Estonia
People's Party of Republicans and Conservatives politicians
20th-century Estonian politicians
21st-century Estonian politicians
Burials at Metsakalmistu
Recipients of the Order of the National Coat of Arms, 4th Class
Recipients of the Order of the National Coat of Arms, 2nd Class